Franklin Taylor Dupree Jr. (October 8, 1913 – December 17, 1995) was a United States district judge of the United States District Court for the Eastern District of North Carolina.

Education and career

Born in Angier, North Carolina, Dupree received an Artium Baccalaureus degree from the University of North Carolina at Chapel Hill in 1933 and a Bachelor of Laws from the University of North Carolina School of Law in 1936. He was in private practice in Angier and Raleigh, North Carolina from 1936 to 1943. He then served in the United States Naval Reserve during World War II, from 1943 to 1946, achieving the rank of Lieutenant. He returned to his private practice in Raleigh from 1946 to 1971.

Federal judicial service

On November 30, 1970, Dupree was nominated by President Richard Nixon to a new seat on the United States District Court for the Eastern District of North Carolina created by 84 Stat. 294. He was confirmed by the United States Senate on December 11, 1970, and received his commission on December 12, 1970. He served as Chief Judge from 1979 to 1983, assuming senior status on December 31, 1983. Dupree served in that capacity until his death on December 17, 1995, in Raleigh.

References

Sources
 

1913 births
1995 deaths
Judges of the United States District Court for the Eastern District of North Carolina
United States district court judges appointed by Richard Nixon
20th-century American judges
United States Navy officers
20th-century American lawyers
People from Harnett County, North Carolina
United States Navy personnel of World War II